Brian Tevreden may refer to:

 Brian Tevreden (footballer, born 1981), Dutch footballer
 Brian Tevreden (footballer, born 1969), Dutch footballer